The Man Who Melted Jack Dann is the name of a word game inspired by Jack Dann's book The Man Who Melted (1984). The aim of the game is to place the writer's name in front or behind the title of one of the writer's book and see if you get a funny sentence. Extra credit is given for shifting a word's part of speech entirely, or appropriating part of the name as part of the sentence or phrase. For example Two Sisters Gore Vidal, The Joy of Cooking Irma S. Rombauer, Captain Blood Returns Raphael Sabatini, Flush Virginia Woolf, Paradise Lost John Milton, Clans of the Alphane Moon Philip K. Dick, Contact Carl Sagan, Tim O'Brien Going after Cacciato, Dan Brown Lost Symbol, and The Martian Chronicles Ray Bradbury.

References

External links 
 http://nielsenhayden.com/jackdann.html

Word games